Abdulnaser Slil (born September 2, 1981) is a Libyan football midfielder who plays for Al-Ittihad. He is a member of the Libya national football team.

External links 

Player profile with Photo – Sporting-heroes.net
Player profile – MTN Africa Cup of Nations 2006

1981 births
Living people
People from Tripoli, Libya
Libyan footballers
Association football midfielders
Libya international footballers
2006 Africa Cup of Nations players
Al-Ittihad Club (Tripoli) players
Libyan Premier League players